Nardaran (also, Nardəran and Nardayan) is a village and the least populous municipality in the Gobustan Rayon of Azerbaijan.  It has a population of 196.

References 

Populated places in Gobustan District